Michael Joseph Kennedy (October 25, 1897 – November 1, 1949) was an American businessman and politician. He was a member of the United States House of Representatives from the state of New York from 1939 to 1943.

Biography
Kennedy was born in New York City in 1897 and attended Sacred Heart Parochial School before becoming a clerk for the New York City Board of Elections in 1921.

He was appointed a New York City Marshal in 1923 and served until 1938, when he became active in the insurance business.

Congress 
Kennedy was elected to the U.S. House of Representatives in 1938 as a Democrat and reelected in 1940. He served from January 1939 to January 1943 (the 76th and 77th Congresses). He was not a candidate for reelection in 1942, and returned to the insurance business. Kennedy had been active in the Tammany Hall organization, and was the organization's leader from 1942 to 1944.

Death 
On November 1, 1949, Kennedy was killed in the crash of Eastern Airlines Flight 537 in Washington, D.C. His remains were interred at the Gate of Heaven Cemetery in Hawthorne, New York.

Family
In 1928, Kennedy married Sally Fischer, who had been his secretary in the city marshal's office.

References

Sources

Newspapers

External sources

People from Manhattan
Victims of aviation accidents or incidents in the United States
Accidental deaths in Washington, D.C.
1949 deaths
1897 births
Democratic Party members of the United States House of Representatives from New York (state)
Burials at Gate of Heaven Cemetery (Hawthorne, New York)
20th-century American politicians
Victims of aviation accidents or incidents in 1949